"Cell Mates" is a song by the Los Angeles-based punk rock band The Bronx, released as the first single from their 2009 album Mariachi El Bronx. The album marks a divergence from the band's usual hardcore punk and hard rock sound in favor of a mariachi style. In June 2008 the band posted a video to YouTube of themselves performing "Cell Mates" in mariachi style under the name "Mariachi El Bronx", an alter ego persona that the band has used to promote and perform the album.

While the album was released by Swami Records, the singles for all of their albums have been released exclusively in the United Kingdom, through Wichita Recordings. The single was released as a translucent green 7-inch vinyl and limited to 1,500 copies. The B-side song is a cover version of Prince's "I Would Die 4 U", originally released on the tribute album Purplish Rain in June 2009. The single's cover artwork was designed by guitarist Joby J. Ford.

The music video for "Cell Mates" was directed by Josh Litwhiler and premiered on August 27, 2009. Filmed at La Cita, a bar in downtown Los Angeles, it depicts the band performing while wearing traditional mariachi-style costumes. Though most of the patrons do not acknowledge the band, a young waitress takes notice and stands attentively in front of the stage. As the band continues to play, decorative lights embedded in their costumes begin to illuminate and blink. At the end of the song, red lights in the waitress' shirt illuminate to form a heart over her left breast.

Track listing

Personnel

Band
 Matt Caughthran – vocals
 Joby J. Ford – guitar, vihuela, jarana, ukulele, requinto romantico
 Vincent Hidalgo – guitarrón, jarana, guitar, requinto romantico
 Ken Horne – guitar
 Brad Magers – horns, backing vocals
 Jorma Vik – drums, percussion

Additional musicians
 John Avila – charango, backing vocals
 Francesca Fernes – viola
 David Hidalgo – accordion, tresillos, guitar
 Bruce Lee – violin
 Alfredo Ortiz – percussion
 Liza Piccadilly – violin
 Lia Teoni – violin

Production
 John Avila – producer, recording, engineer, mixing engineer
 Gavin Lurssssen – mastering
 William V. Malpede – string arrangement and conducting

Artwork
 Joby J. Ford – artwork

See also
The Bronx discography

References

The Bronx (band) songs
2009 singles
2009 songs